Achy may refer to:

 Suffering from pain
 Stéphane Achy (born 1988), Gabonese footballer
 Achy Obejas, (born 1956), Cuban-American writer and translator focused on personal and national identity issues
 Achy, Oise, commune of France